The 2008 European Speedway Club Champions' Cup.

Calendar

Allocation

Semi-final 
Semi-Final
May 31, 2008 (5:00 pm)
 Daugavpils
Referee: ?
Attendance: ?
Best Time: ?

Final 
Final
September 6, 2008
 Slaný
Referee: ?
Attendance: ?
Best Time: ?

References 
pzm.pl - UEM Calendar 2008
pzm.pl - Allocation

See also 

2008
European Club